Stephen Ray (second ¼ 1906 – death unknown) was a Welsh professional rugby league footballer who played in the 1920s and 1930s.

Background
Steve Ray's birth was registered in Newport district, Wales

Playing career

International honours
Steve Ray won 2 caps for Wales in 1930–1932 while at Wakefield Trinity, and Warrington.

Club career
Steve Ray made his début for Wakefield Trinity during November 1928, and he played his last match for Wakefield Trinity during November 1931, he made his début for Warrington on Saturday 30 January 1932, and he played his last match for Warrington on Saturday 30 December 1933.

Club records
Steve Ray set Warrington's "Most Tries In A Season" record with 33-tries in 44-matches during the 1932–33 season, this was subsequently extended by Brian Bevan to 48, 57, 60, and finally 66-tries.

References

External links
Statistics at wolvesplayers.thisiswarrington.co.uk

1906 births
Place of death missing
Oldham R.L.F.C. players
Rugby league wingers
Rugby league players from Newport, Wales
Wakefield Trinity players
Wales national rugby league team players
Warrington Wolves players
Welsh rugby league players
Year of death missing